Unzhlag or Unzhensky ITL (Unzhensky corrective labor camp) was a  camp of the GULAG system of labor camps in the Soviet Union. Named after the Unzha River, it has headquarters at the railway station Sukhobezvodnoye (Сухобезводное, Сухобезводная), Gorky Oblast. It operated from February 5, 1938 to 1960. The main operation was logging and wood processing industries, but also served a wide variety of other small-scale industries: construction, metalworking, railroad servicing, clothing, footwear, pottery production, etc. The camp had 30 sites (lagpunkts)

Notable inmates
Yusif Vazir Chamanzaminli, Azerbaijani statesman and writer.
Dalia Grinkevičiūtė, Lithuanian school girl deported in June 1941 who later wrote a memoir about her experiences
Lev Kopelev describes his experience in Unzhlag in his book, To Be Preserved Forever.
, Belarusian literary critic, publisher, and cultural activist; served some of his time in Unzhlag, among several other camps.
, Russian revolutionary and Soviet statesman, Menshevik.

Gallery

See also

References

Camps of the Gulag